The Swedish Book Review is a literary journal, first appearing in 1983. Its founding publisher was St. David's University College in Lampeter. Then it began to be published by Norvik Press, which was formerly based at the University of East Anglia and then at the Department of Scandinavian Studies at University College London.

The journal is published twice yearly. These issues come out in spring and autumn and are prepared for the London Book Fair and the Frankfurt Book Fair, respectively. In addition, a specialised “supplement” edition is produced each year.

The journal aims to bring Swedish-language literature to an English-speaking audience, and does so through reviews, translations, and features dealing with Swedish literary matters.

See also
List of literary magazines

References

External links
 Swedish Book Review website

1983 establishments in the United Kingdom
Biannual magazines published in the United Kingdom
Book review magazines
Literary magazines published in the United Kingdom
English-language magazines
Magazines published in London
Magazines established in 1983